Mesocyparis is an extinct genus of uncertain placement within the family Cupressaceae.

References

Cupressaceae
Prehistoric gymnosperm genera
Prehistoric plants of North America
Conifer genera